The River Greta is a river flowing through Lancashire and North Yorkshire in the north of England.

The river is formed by the confluence of the River Twiss and the River Doe at Ingleton.

From Ingleton, the Greta travels westwards through Burton-in-Lonsdale and, over the border in Lancashire, Cantsfield and Wrayton, passing Thurland Castle, where the Greta flows into the River Lune.

References 

Rivers of Lancashire
Rivers of North Yorkshire
Rivers of Lancaster
1Greta